Al-Badʿ is a town in Tabuk Region, Saudi Arabia. It is west of Tabuk, Saudi Arabia, between  Tabuk and the Red Sea Coast. Located at 28° 41' N and 35° 18' E, it lies on the border of the Hejaz, and was in antiquity in Southern Midian.
Al-Bad is located in the valley of the Wadi Aful  in a highland area (218m ASL). It is  near the town of  Tayyib Al-Ism and approx. 25 km east of the eastern coast of the Gulf of Aqaba,  part of the Red Sea where there are pristine coral reefs.  
In 1995, 2 people at  Al-Bad' died during the Gulf of Aqaba earthquake.

Hijaz Mountains
To the east of  the town is the Sarwat ranges, the northern end of the Hijaz Mountains. This area is known for Neolithic petroglyphs carved into the arid volcanic rock. Northeast of the town is the peak Jabal al-Lawz, which at 8400 feet is one of the highest peaks in Saudi Arabia. The mountain Jabal Maqla' is to the south of  Jabal al Lawz. This 7600 foot high volcanic peak is, like Jabal Lawz, crowned with black basalt. Much of this volcanic  region is granite and vegetation is sparse grassland with the occasional tree.

Religious significance
The town of Al-Bad' is within the traditional Hejaz region of Saudi Arabia, and the population are Muslim.
Some two kilometers south of the town of al-Bad' are caves called by the local people "Magha'ir Shu'ayb" (the Caves of Jethro). Modern archaeologists hold that the caves are 1st century AD Nabatean tombs.

Local tradition also holds that "Bir al Saidni" located in the nearby coastal town of Makna, is the very well from which Moses rolled away the stone to draw water for the flocks of Jethro's daughters.  The town of Makna (or Magna) is on the Red Sea coast to the southwest of al-Bad'. A Jewish community was known here from at least the 9th century AD.

The nearby town of Tayyib Al-Ism is important to some Mormons as they believe it is referenced in the book of Mormon.

Evangelicals writers, Bob Cornuke, Ron Wyatt and Lennart Möller, hold that Jabal al-Lawz, is the real biblical Mount Sinai.

References

Populated coastal places in Saudi Arabia
Populated places in Tabuk Province
Underwater diving sites in Saudi Arabia
Red Sea